Mark Raymond is an American football coach, currently serving as the head football coach at Williams College. Raymond served as the head football coach at St. Lawrence University from 2010 to 2015, winning two conference titles and compiling an overall record of 31–30. Raymond was named Liberty League Coach of the Year following the conclusion of both the 2010 and 2015 seasons at St. Lawrence. Raymond was named head football coach at Williams College on February 24, 2016.

Head coaching record

References

External links
 Williams profile
 St. Lawrence profile
 Ithaca profile

Year of birth missing (living people)
Living people
Buffalo Bulls football players
Ithaca Bombers football coaches
St. Lawrence Saints football coaches
SUNY Canton Roos football coaches
Syracuse Orange football coaches
Williams Ephs football coaches